Lucian-Hamilton Field is a baseball park in Austin in the U.S. state of Texas and the home of the St. Edward's Hilltoppers baseball team.

References

Baseball venues in Greater Austin
Baseball venues in Texas
1968 establishments in Texas
Sports venues completed in 1968
College baseball venues in the United States
St. Edward's Hilltoppers baseball